Marlene Willis (January 13, 1942 - March 29, 1982) was an American singer, who performed on many televised variety shows during the 1950s, and later appeared as a guest star in some narrative television series.

Early life
She was born Marlene Audrey Willis in Levelland, Texas to Woodrow Wilson Willis, an oilfield worker, and Anna Mae Spangler. She was the third of four children.  While still a toddler, her family moved to Fresno, California, where she attended Rowell Elementary School and Yosemite Middle School.

Child singer
Marlene sang impromptu at a picnic concert when just seven years old, and became hooked on the applause. According to a much later newspaper account, Marlene had "a natural ability to echo in perfect pitch any tune or melody she has heard one time". She and her brother Woodie sang for local talent shows in Fresno for several years before she went solo. Fresno performer Al Radka got her a singing gig on radio station KARM AM, which led to her winning a televised talent show in San Francisco in early January 1953. During March 1953 she sang on local TV station KFRE for the Fresno Spring Home Show. She continued to perform for Fresno area events throughout 1953.

Marlene Willis and her family moved from Fresno to North Hollywood in early 1954, where her father took a job as a propman at Paramount. She performed on several musical variety shows that year, including Sandy's Hayride and The Spade Cooley Show. She then took a job as a vocalist with Frank DeVol and his orchestra for another TV show, from which she was signed to a contract by bandleader/producer Hoarce Heidt.

During early 1955 Marlene competed against other singers on The Swift Show Wagon with Hoarce Heidt and the American Way, a roving television program that broadcast each episode from a different state. The show was a mixture of variety acts by well-known entertainers, with a talent competition for amateurs. Like many of its contemporaries, the show used an applause meter to measure live audience reaction for determining contest winners. Unlike them, however, The Swift Show Wagon did not reveal the actual results to the live and TV audiences; instead, a celebrity judge would look at the meters and proclaim the winner. Referring to Marlene's streak of five consecutive wins, a TV critic for The Boston Globe thought Hoarce Heidt would do well to include a little more transparency.

Heidt acknowledged Marlene's professional status by billing her as a featured performer on the following Saturday night's show from Texas. Left unacknowledged was that Heidt had signed her to a contract before she ever competed on The Swift Show Wagon. Heidt had a single by Marlene released by Magnolia Records, Washboard Boogie backed with Mother, Mother, Mother.

For the show's final episode on October 1, 1955, the fiction of being a contestant was again resumed. With the ending of The Swift Show Wagon Marlene returned to singing at local events and supper clubs.

Teenage career
As a teenager Marlene Willis attended the Hollywood Professional School, which offered flexible schedules for young performers. She and schoolmates The Collins Kids landed headliner roles on a teen-oriented variety show called Rockin' Rhythm on KTTV in June 1956. The show was a summer replacement and ended in August 1956. She then continued her live singing performances at venues around the Los Angeles area. During early January 1957 she returned to television with a guest spot on The Bob Crosby Show.

Though she had never taken voice lessons and had previously sung only at live performances, Marlene Willis now signed her first recording contract with Zephyr Records in late February 1957. Zephyr issued only one single with her, which promptly faded away from lack of promotion.

She also signed in May 1957 with Regal Pictures for her first acting job, in a musical film originally titled Mother Was a Stripper but later released as Rockabilly Baby. Filming took place in June, with fifteen year old Marlene Willis recording two songs for the soundtrack, Is It Love? and I'd Rather Be.

Newspapers reported in September 1957 that she had been signed to another recording contract, this time with Verve Records, and to another movie, Attack of the Puppet People for which she was to record four songs. A few days later she was pictured handing in a check for the defense fund of a Louisiana Black man, whom a group of fifteen Hollywood producers, directors, and actors felt was wrongfully condemned. That same year she had two more guest singing spots on television shows.

Besides her television spots, Marlene continued singing at live events in spring 1958, drawing energy from the audience's applause. Verve released a single in March with Star Light, Star Bright, which Marlene plugged on another TV show later that month. That summer Verve released a multi-artist LP Songs For Your Boyfriend with Marlene's photo and name dominating the cover, though she had only three tracks on it.

Later career
Following the release of her second film and the Verve album, there was a sudden drop-off in professional engagements for Marlene that lasted well into the Fall of 1959. In October 1959 she decided to sign a five-year contract with ERA Records, and also obtained her first TV acting role a month later. Following her eighteenth birthday in January 1960, she began acting in narrative television series on a regular basis. Her first starring role was on an episode of Bourbon Street Beat in June 1960, for which one critic said: "Marlene gets her first starring part here, is a natural, and no longer will have to cavort on the West Coast hoe-down circuit... She is an actress now". Another strong role in 1960 was as the leading lady of an episode of Maverick titled "Flood's Folly" starring Roger Moore as Beau Maverick; she portrayed a ravishing young damsel in distress trapped by her own mother in an enormous former hotel in the middle of the Rockies.

The regular monthly roles on TV series dried up in early 1961, while ERA Records only ever issued two singles by Marlene. By 1964 she had joined the Juan Esquivel Orchestra as a jazz vocalist playing the casino circuit in Nevada, then wound down her career performing at clubs on the Sunset Strip during 1965.

Personal life
According to interviewer Lydia Lane, Marlene confirmed she never had a voice lesson, and also said she was bed-ridden with polio for six months as a younger teen. Columnist Paul Coates gave the gist of a press release from her publicity agent describing Marlene at age 17 as standing 5 feet 4 inches tall and weighing 113 pounds, with hazel green eyes.
 
For most of her career, Marlene's age protected her from gossip columnists. As she reached eighteen, magazines began showing her on "photo-layout" dates with other actors, as was common for publicity of that time period. While still attending Hollywood Professional School, Marlene met and began dating Steve Stevens, then a young actor. Their brief relationship was real, not publicity, but ended when Stevens started associating with mobster Mickey Cohen.

Marlene married Kerry Hodges on August 13, 1966, in Los Angeles, who was two years her senior. She died of cancer at age 40 on March 29, 1982.

Discography

Filmography

References

External links
 
 Find-A-Grave

1942 births
1982 deaths
20th-century American actresses